Adiantum bellum (Bermuda maidenhair fern) is a species of fern in the family Pteridaceae, and is native to Bermuda.

It is 1 of 19 ferns native to Bermuda, the only native maidenhair, and the most prolific fern on the island. It is found only on Bermuda; however, the IPNI reports it also found in Guiana.

Description

Adiantum bellum is deciduous. In the wild it grows in crevices, on cliffs and under rock ledges, in roadside verge, and terrestrially on hillsides. It requires moisture and shade and is often prolific near streams if in well-drained sites. Benjamin D. Gilbert described a variety of A. bellum which he called walsingense; however, it is believed that this is just a variety produced by better soil and moisture conditions.

The other maidenhair fern that now grows wild on Bermuda, Adiantum capillus-veneris, was introduced by Governor Lefroy.

Cultivation
Bermuda maidenhair fern is sometimes grown in gardens; however, it is not hardy and does better indoors. It prefers low to medium light, and moist potting mix. The cultivar Adiantum raddianum 'Pacottii' has been mislabeled as this species in the horticultural trade.

Notes

External links
"Bermuda maidenhair" photo by Don Lubin at Ferns et al. of New England
Bermuda maidenhair fern Page, Bermuda Department of Conservation Services.
"Adiantum bellum (Bermuda maidenhair fern)" Zipcode Zoo

Gallery

bellum
Ferns of the Americas
Flora of Bermuda